Governor Emerson may refer to:

Frank Emerson (1882–1931), 15th Governor of Wyoming
Lee E. Emerson (1898–1976), 69th Governor of Vermont

See also
Louis Lincoln Emmerson (1863–1941), 27th Governor of Illinois